John Calvin Coolidge (September 7, 1906 – May 31, 2000) was an American executive, businessman, and entrepreneur with the New York, New Haven and Hartford Railroad. He was the first son of President Calvin Coolidge and Grace Coolidge.

Early life

John Coolidge was born in Northampton, Massachusetts, on September 7, 1906. He was the elder of the two children of Calvin Coolidge (1872–1933), the 30th President of the United States from 1923 to 1929 and Grace Anna Goodhue (1879–1957), First Lady of the United States from 1923 to 1929. In his autobiography, Calvin Coolidge recorded his impressions of the birth of his first son: "The fragrance of the clematis which covered the bay window filled the room like a benediction where the mother lay with her baby. It was all very wonderful to us." On July 7, 1924, his younger brother, Calvin Jr., died from blood poisoning. John rarely spoke of the tragedy beyond acknowledging the terrible sadness it caused the family, especially his father.

Coolidge attended Mercersburg Academy in Mercersburg, Pennsylvania, and graduated in 1924. He then enrolled at Amherst College, his father's alma mater, graduating in 1928; Coolidge had graduated from both schools while his father was President.

Career

He was an executive with the New York, New Haven and Hartford Railroad. He served as president of the Connecticut Manifold Forms Company until 1960, when he reopened the Plymouth Cheese Corporation in Plymouth at the historic village. He helped start the Coolidge Foundation and his gifts of buildings, land, and artifacts were instrumental in creating the President Calvin Coolidge State Historic Site.

Well into his 80s, Coolidge was seen shuttling back and forth from his home near the Calvin Coolidge Historical Site to collect his mail at the old post office located on the historic site. He was reportedly a charming and excited talker who would still answer visitors' questions about his father or his family, and who would, on occasion, give a rare personal interview.

Personal life

On September 23, 1929, at Plainville, Connecticut, he married Florence Trumbull. She was born on November 30, 1904, at Plainville, Connecticut, the daughter of Connecticut governor John H. Trumbull and Maud Pierce Usher. The Coolidges had two daughters:

Cynthia Coolidge Jeter (October 28, 1933 – January 23, 1989)
Lydia Coolidge Sayles (August 14, 1939 – March 2, 2001)

Florence died on February 15, 1998, at Plymouth Notch, Vermont, and Coolidge died on May 31, 2000, at Lebanon, Grafton County, New Hampshire. He is buried beside his wife, parents, brother, and several generations of the Coolidge family in the Plymouth Notch Cemetery at Plymouth, Windsor County, Vermont.

Ancestry and family relations

Coolidge's family had deep roots in New England. His earliest American ancestor, John Coolidge, emigrated from Cottenham, Cambridgeshire, England, around 1630 and settled in Watertown, Massachusetts.  Coolidge was also descended as follows from Edmund Rice, who arrived at Watertown in 1638 and settled in Sudbury, Massachusetts:
 John Coolidge, son of
 John Calvin Coolidge Jr. (1872–1933), son of
 John Calvin Coolidge Sr. (1845–1926), son of
 Sarah Almeda Brewer (–1???), daughter of
 Israel Chase "C." Brewer (1797–?), son of
 Sarah "Sally" Rice (1750–1???), daughter of
 Bezaleel Rice Jr. (1721–1806), son of
 Bezaleel Rice Sr. (1697–?), son of
 David Rice (1659–1723), son of
 Henry Rice (1617–1711), son of
 Edmund Rice (1594–1663)

He was also a descendant (on his mother's side) of Richard Warren, who arrived at Plymouth in November 1620 aboard the Mayflower. Richard Warren was also the 12th signer of the Mayflower Compact.

Explanatory notes

Citations

Works cited

 
 Feldman, Ruth Tenzer. Calvin Coolidge Presidential leaders; Publisher: Twenty-First Century Books, 2006 .

External links

 National Park Service site on the Coolidge Homestead
 President Calvin Coolidge State Historic Site – official website
 Biographical sketch of John Harper Trumbull Connecticut State Library
 
 

1906 births
2000 deaths
20th-century American businesspeople
20th-century American politicians
American people of English descent
Amherst College alumni
Burials in Vermont
Businesspeople from Connecticut
Businesspeople from Vermont
Children of presidents of the United States
Children of vice presidents of the United States
Coolidge family
Massachusetts Republicans
Mercersburg Academy alumni
People from Northampton, Massachusetts
People from Plymouth, Vermont
Vermont Republicans